Stokell's smelt (Stokellia anisodon) is a small freshwater fish, found in rivers between the Waiau and Waitaki Rivers on the east coast of the South Island of New Zealand. It is the only member of the genus Stokellia.

In recent years their numbers have declined rapidly.

References

External links
 
 NIWA June 2006

Stokell's smelt
Endemic freshwater fish of New Zealand
Fish of the South Island
Taxa named by Gilbert Percy Whitley
Taxa named by Gerald Stokell
Stokell's smelt